The 2012 Texas Democratic presidential primary was held on May 29, 2012. Incumbent Barack Obama, who was running for the nomination without any major opposition, won the primary with 88.18% of the vote, and was awarded all of Texas' 287 delegates to the 2012 Democratic National Convention.

References

Texas
Democratic presidential primary
2012